John W. Forgety (born March 28, 1946)  is a Republican member of the Tennessee House of Representatives for the 23rd district, encompassing Athens, McMinn County and part of Monroe County, Tellico Plains, Rural Vale, and Coker Creek.

Biography
Forgety is a native of Knoxville, Tennessee. He was a school administrator for forty years and served in the Tennessee Army National Guard for twenty years along with deploying to Iraq in 2004 to 2005. In 2011, he was elected as a Republican Representative for the 23rd district, a seat formerly represented by now-Senator Mike Bell. Regarding education, he has said he is critical of student evaluations. He is the President of the Athens chapter of the Kiwanis.

Forgety is married with two children. He is a Baptist. He lives in Athens, Tennessee with his wife, Faye.

References

1946 births
Living people
Politicians from Knoxville, Tennessee
Republican Party members of the Tennessee House of Representatives
21st-century American politicians